The Pallas Karting, Pallas Karting Tynagh is a tarmac karting track near Loughrea, County Galway in Ireland. There is also a track configuration designed for rally and rallycross events.

There are three track configurations: 500m beginners track, a 1500m advanced track, and a 2200m Rally track.

Every year since 1999 Pallas Karting has been hosting National Karting Championships. In recent years Pallas Karting secured the hosting of Rally Sprint events, and also hosted a round of Irish Rallycross Championship in 2019. Motor clubs such as Galway Motor Club and Ballynasloe Vintage Club are holding events in Pallas Karting track. The track is approved by the Motorsport Ireland.

References

External links
Official Homepage
Official Facebook page

Motorsport venues in the Republic of Ireland
Sports venues in County Galway